Giles Crouch Kellogg (August 12, 1781 – June 19, 1861) was an American politician.

He was son of Dr. Giles C. and Mary (Catlin) Kellogg, and was born in Hadley, Massachusetts.  He graduated from Yale University in 1800.  He studied law with Jonathan E. Porter, Esq., was admitted to the bar in Hampshire County, Massachusetts, opened an office in his native place and here spent his life. He was honored by his townsmen with many private and public trusts. For many years, he was town clerk and treasurer and, for thirteen years, Register of Deeds for Hampshire County. He was often representative to the General Court of Massachusetts and was a member of the Massachusetts Constitutional Convention of 1853. In the War of 1812, he served as an adjutant in one of the Massachusetts regiments. For several years, he taught successfully in the Hopkins Academy in Hadley. He died in Hadley, Mass., aged 80.

References

1781 births
1861 deaths
Yale University alumni
People from Hadley, Massachusetts
Members of the Massachusetts House of Representatives
American military personnel of the War of 1812
19th-century American politicians